Cradle of Thorns was an American rock band. Formed in 1988 in Bakersfield, California by singer Ty Elam, the band was initially defined by their gothic rock style. After releasing their debut album, Remember It Day, independently in 1990, the band signed with Triple X Records, and would come to be defined by a more dance music-oriented style influenced by heavy metal and industrial rock. In 1998, the band changed their name to Videodrone and signed with Korn's vanity label Elementree Records, releasing their self titled fourth album, Videodrone the following year, which featured a mix of industrial music and nu metal. Videodrone disbanded two years later, but reformed under their original name from 2007 to 2015.

History

Formation and Remember It Day (1988–1990)
In 1988 vocalist Ty Elam formed Cradle of Thorns. They toured extensively and earned an underground following. They released an independent record entitled Remember It Day in 1990.

Feed-Us (1994–1995)
The band signed with Triple X Records (label of Jane's Addiction and Social Distortion) and in 1994 released Feed-Us, produced by Ross Robinson.

Download This! (1996–1998)
1996's Download This! saw the departure of female vocalist Tamera Slayton and bassist Scat Elis. New bassist Purdy Spackle joined the group. The song "Bulimia Blowjob" features an appearance by vocalist Aimee Echo of Human Waste Project and TheSTART, and Jeff Schartoff, of Human Waste Project and Professional Murder Music.

Name change and Videodrone (1998–2000)
For their fourth album, bassist Purdy Spackle was replaced by Mavis. They renamed themselves Videodrone, as a play on the film Videodrome, because the band wanted a name that sounded futuristic and retro at the same time, evoking the 1980s, the decade in which the film was released. Their twelve-track, self-titled CD was released in 1999 with appearances from Korn's Jonathan Davis on "Ty Jonathan Down", Limp Bizkit's Fred Durst and DJ Lethal on "Human Piñata", and Psycho Realm on "Pig in a Blanket".  Also from Korn, Head played guitar on "Power Tools for Girls" and Fieldy produced the album.

Break up and post-Videodrone projects (2000–2006)
After touring with Korn, Rob Zombie, Orgy, and Machine Head, lack of label support and drug problems spelled the end for Videodrone (as detailed in the interview with Elam on the "All Over Again" maxi-single). Drummer Kris Kohls went on to play for Adema and vocalist Ty Elam would go on to play in local Bakersfield bands Karmahitlist, Three Chord Whore, and Arrival of Fawn after Videodrone's demise in 2000.

Reformation (2007–2015)
In 2007, Ty Elam resurrected the band under its original moniker Cradle of Thorns with all new members. The song "All Over Again" was released as a single, which can be heard on the band's official MySpace page. Elam later appeared on metal band Mastiv's album, End of the Silence, released in 2011. By 2015, Cradle of Thorns's official homepage ceased, and nothing has been stated regarding the group's future since.

Style and influences
Cradle of Thorns initially began as a gothic rock band before shifting to a "heavy, but dark dance" style that fuses heavy metal, industrial rock and hard rock with genres such as funk, gothic rock, jazz, opera and hip hop. This style has been classified as industrial and nu metal. The band's influences include horror film scores and Korn. They have been described as a cross between Korn, Orgy and Marilyn Manson.

Members 

Current
Ty Elam – vocals (1988–2000), drums (2006–2015)
Steve Thiriot – guitar, synthesizers, screams (2007–2015)
Matt Wilkinson – bass (2007–2015)

Former
David File – guitar (1988–2000)
Kris Kohls – drums (1988–2000)
Rohan Cowden – keyboards (1988–2000)
Tamera Slayton – vocals (1988–1995)
Jay Caruso – bass (1988–1992)
Scat Elis – bass (1992–1995)
Purdy Spackle – bass (1995–1997)
Mavis – bass (1997–2000)

 Timeline

Discography

Cradle of Thorns
Remember It Day (1990)
Feed-Us (1994)
Download This! (1996)

Videodrone
Videodrone (February 23, 1999)

Singles

Music videos

References

External links

American gothic rock groups
American industrial music groups
Musical groups established in 1988
Nu metal musical groups from California
Triple X Records artists